Hélion de Villeneuve (c. 1270 – 1346) was a French-born Grand Master of the Knights of St. John.  He was the brother of Saint Roseline.

He died on the island of Rhodes.

The blazon of his coat-of-arms was Gules six tilting spears in fretty, in-between the spears semy of escutcheons, all or.

There is a legend told of Hélion involving a dragon and a young knight.

References

Villeneuve, Helion de
1270 births
1346 deaths
14th-century French people